Magliano may refer to several places in Italy:

Municipalities (comuni)
Magliano Alfieri, in the province of Cuneo, Piedmont
Magliano Alpi, in the province of Cuneo, Piedmont
Magliano de' Marsi, in the province of L'Aquila, Abruzzo
Magliano di Tenna, in the province of Ascoli Piceno, Marche
Magliano in Toscana, in the province of Grosseto, Tuscany
Magliano Romano, in the province of Rome, Lazio
Magliano Sabina, in the province of Rieti, Lazio
Magliano Vetere, in the province of Salerno, Campania

Hamlets (frazioni)
Magliano (Carmiano), in the municipality of Carmiano (LE), Apulia
Magliano (Torricella Sicura), in the municipality of Torricella Sicura (TE), Abruzzo
Magliano Nuovo, in the municipality of Magliano Vetere (SA), Campania

See also
Santa Croce di Magliano, an Italian municipality of the province of Campobasso, Molise